In mathematics, the Brauer–Nesbitt theorem can refer to  several different theorems proved by Richard Brauer and Cecil J. Nesbitt in the representation theory of finite groups.

In modular representation theory,
the Brauer–Nesbitt theorem on blocks of defect zero states that a character whose order is divisible by the highest power of a prime p dividing the order of a finite group remains irreducible when reduced mod p and vanishes on all elements whose order is divisible by p. Moreover, it belongs to a block of defect zero. A block of defect zero contains only one ordinary character and only one modular character.

Another version states that if k is a field of characteristic zero, A is a k-algebra, V, W are semisimple A-modules which are finite dimensional over k, and TrV = TrW as elements of Homk(A,k), then V and W are isomorphic as A-modules.

Let  be a group and  be some field.

As a consequence, let  be a semisimple (continuous) -adic representations of the absolute Galois group of some field , unramified outside some finite set of primes .

References
Curtis, Reiner, Representation theory of finite groups and associative algebras, Wiley 1962. 
Brauer, R.; Nesbitt, C. On the modular characters of groups. Ann. of Math. (2) 42, (1941). 556-590.

Representation theory of finite groups
Theorems about algebras
Theorems in group theory